The canton of Virieu-le-Grand  is a former administrative division in eastern France. It was disbanded following the French canton reorganisation which came into effect in March 2015. It had 4,348 inhabitants (2012).

The canton comprised 13 communes:

Armix
La Burbanche
Ceyzérieu
Cheignieu-la-Balme
Contrevoz
Cuzieu
Flaxieu
Marignieu
Pugieu
Rossillon
Saint-Martin-de-Bavel
Virieu-le-Grand
Vongnes

Demographics

See also
Cantons of the Ain department

References

Former cantons of Ain
2015 disestablishments in France
States and territories disestablished in 2015